Doll Elements is a Japanese female idol group. It was formed as a unit consisting of 3rd generation trainees of the group Lovely Doll.

On July 3, 2013, Doll Elements debuted on the major label Dreamusic with their single "Kimi no Heart ni Toki Hanatsu!". The group disbanded on January 14, 2017.

Members

Former member

Discography

Singles

References

External links

Doll Elements' profile on the website of the record label Dreamusic

All-female bands
Japanese girl groups
Japanese idol groups
Japanese pop music groups
Musical groups established in 2011
2011 establishments in Japan
2016 disestablishments in Japan
Musical groups from Tokyo
Dreamusic artists